Bachman's warbler (Vermivora bachmanii) is a likely extinct passerine migratory bird. This warbler was a migrant, breeding in swampy blackberry and cane thickets of the Southeastern and Midwestern United States and wintering in Cuba. There are some reports of the bird from the twenty-first century, but none are widely accepted.  Some authorities accept a sighting in Louisiana, in August 1988 as confirmed, but the last uncontroversial sightings date to the 1960s.

Taxonomy
This bird was first recorded in 1832 by the Reverend John Bachman, who found the species near Charleston, South Carolina, and presented study skins and descriptions to his friend and collaborator, John James Audubon. Audubon never saw the bird alive but named it in honor of Bachman in 1833.

The blue-winged and rapidly declining golden-winged warblers, also members of the genus Vermivora, are thought to be this warbler's closest relatives. There are no known subspecies.

Description
 
Bachman's warbler is a sexually dimorphic species and the adults have two distinct plumages, one in the spring and one in the fall. In the spring, adult males have a yellow forehead and supercilium. The area below the bird's eye is yellow, while the lores are a dusky olive. The bird's forecrown is black with gray at the edges, while the rear crown and nape are olive-gray. The rest of the warbler's upperparts are an olive green, with the rump being the brightest. The chin and upper throat are yellow, while the center throat and upper chest are black. The belly is yellow, and the undertail coverts are white. Males in their first spring are nearly identical to the adult male, but have less black on their crown and chest.

During the spring, adult females are a light yellow in their forehead and supraloral, blending into a gray crown and nape. Its lores are a gray-olive and it has a white eye ring. The rest of the female's upperparts are an olive-green, which like the male is brightest on the rump. The chin and throat are also a light yellow, while the sides of the neck and the upper breast are gray. Older females have a few black upper breast feathers. The rest of the breast and the belly is light yellow, blending into white on the undertail coverts. The flanks are also washed with gray. First spring females resemble the adult female, but appear duller.

Bachman's warbler molts over the summer into its fall plumage. For adult males, the fall plumage is nearly identical to the spring, with the only difference being that the forecrown changes from black to gray. First year males also resemble their spring plumage, but have an olive forecrown and duller yellow underparts. Adult females possess the same plumage, although it looks fresher in the fall, while first year females have an olive-yellow forehead and a dull eyering.

Hatchlings obtain their first plumage in May and undergo their first molt in June. Juvenile Bachman's warblers have a dusky brown head and upperparts and are a paler brown below, which transitions to dull white on the lower body and undertail.

It is relatively small for a warbler and has a short tail. It is unique amongst warblers for its thin and decurved bill. The Bachman's warbler's bill is blackish brown in adults and brown in the juveniles. The legs are a grayish-brown, while the eyes are dark brown.

Voice
Documented examples of the species' songs are composed of a rapid series of six to twenty-five buzz notes, sometimes ending in a sharp, slurred zip note. The song is similar to that of the northern parula, but distinguishable in that it was noticeably monotone. Multiple call notes have been recorded, ranging from a soft tsip to a low, hissing zee-e-eep.

Distribution and habitat

Bachman's warbler breeds primarily in two distinct regions, namely the southern Atlantic coastal plain and the Gulf Coast states north along the Mississippi River watershed to Kentucky. In the southern Atlantic coastal plain, the bird breeds in South Carolina near Charleston, though it is believed to have once bred as far north as Virginia and south into Georgia. The Gulf Coast breeding habitat is located primarily in central Alabama, though reports from northern Mississippi and Louisiana are known. It breeds north of Alabama along Arkansas's and Missouri's St. Francis River. Unaccepted records of breeding in eastern Texas, Oklahoma, and Tennessee are known. During migration, the species was primarily recorded in Florida and the Florida Keys, although a few birds migrated along the eastern Gulf Coast. Additionally, there is one spring migration record from the Bahamas in 1901. The species primarily winters in Cuba. Additionally, it was recorded wintering on the Isle of Pines, and one wintering record is known from Florida. Unconfirmed reports of the species wintering in Georgia's Okefenokee Swamp exist.

Bachman's warbler breeds in timbered bottomland swamps with pools of still water. These swampy forests are mainly composed of deciduous trees such as cypress, sweet gum, dogwood, red oak, hickory, black gum, and tupelo. While it is not definitively known what microhabitat in these swamps Bachman's warblers prefer, it is believed that they prefer small edges created by fire or storms with a dense understory of the cane species Arundinaria gigantea and palmettos. Some believe that this species may be a cane specialist.

While migrating, the species still prefers bottomland forests, though it has been reported in scrubby habitats when this is not available. During the Cuban winter it seems to broaden its habitat to include most forests, ranging from dry, semideciduous forests to urban parks to swamps. Hibiscus forests may be important to wintering warblers.

Ecology and behavior
 
Due to the rarity of this species, little is known of its behavior. This species does not frequently pump its tail. When alarmed, a Bachman's warbler will jerk its tail and raise its crown feathers.

This species does not frequently sing while migrating. Once it reaches its breeding grounds, this warbler prefers to sing from high perches.  The female warbler incubates the eggs while the male looks for food.

However, during migration it has also been observed foraging in the tops of trees. This warbler could feed while hanging upside down to probe the bottoms of leaves. Bachman's warbler also feeds by gleaning and probing into leaf clusters. This latter foraging strategy has led some to hypothesize that this warbler specializes in foraging among dead leaves in canebrakes. Its primary prey includes caterpillars, spiders, and other arthropods. It may feed on nectar in Cuba, but this hypothesis is unproven.

It may be a colonial breeder. The nests are deep and bulky. Dead leaves, mosses, grasses, and weed stalks compose the exterior of the nest, while the interior cup was lined with fine fibers from Ramalina lichen and Spanish moss. Unusually for a warbler, its eggs are pure white with occasional fine marks at the large end.

Migration
Bachman's warblers migrate quite early in comparison with other New World warblers. Spring migration begins in late February and birds appear in south Florida and southeastern Louisiana by the first week of March. Peak migration in south Florida is during the first three weeks of March and along the northwestern Florida coast during the third and fourth week of March. The latest recorded Bachman's warbler in Florida was noted on April 9. These warblers reach their South Carolina breeding grounds around mid-March, though some are known to arrive in late February. Birds migrating to southeastern Missouri arrive between mid and late April. Some birds overshoot their breeding grounds and are found in Virginia and North Carolina.

In South Carolina, all Bachman's warblers leave their breeding ground by July 19. The peak of fall migration is poorly documented, but the earliest date for a migrant in southern Mississippi is July 4, while the first migrants at Key West were reported on July 17. All migration is between the end of July and August 25, with the last reported migrating individual being a September 24 bird in coastal Georgia.

Conservation
 
Bachman's warbler was originally collected by John Bachman in South Carolina in 1832 and described by Audubon in 1833 from skins mailed by Bachman. It remained largely unknown until the mid-1880s. It is believed that selective logging in the 1800s briefly benefited the species by providing more habitat. It was frequently seen in its breeding habitat from the mid-1880s to 1910. However, when clear-cutting began replacing selective logging, sightings of this species grew scarce. By the 1930s, sightings were rare, and in 1940 the last definite winter sighting was recorded. The last male specimen was collected on March 21, 1941, on Deer Island, Mississippi, while the last female specimen was collected on February 28, 1940, on Ship Island, Mississippi.

Reports of birds from the Missouri and Arkansas breeding grounds lasted through the 1940s, while birds were reported breeding in South Carolina's I'on Swamp until 1953. Individuals were reported from Fairfax County, Virginia, in 1954 and 1958, and a male was seen singing near I'on Swamp in April 1962. On March 30, 1977, an immature female was seen in Brevard County, Florida.  The last confirmed observation was in Louisiana in 1988. Reliable reports of sightings of the species from Congaree National Park in the early 2000s prompted a formal investigation, but were eventually attributed to misidentifications of hooded warbler sightings and northern parula songs. A thorough and systematic search using playback of recorded Bachman's warbler songs did not reveal any territorial males and did not provoke any aggressive response from other bird species, and the survey leaders concluded the species was not present in the park during their search.

This species is threatened due to habitat destruction. It is thought to have nested in canebrakes, the loss of which poses a threat, as does the loss of wintering habitat in the Caribbean and plume hunting. Small-scale logging in the 1800s may actually have increased the Bachman warbler's breeding habitat. Clearcutting of its habitat and the draining of swamps via water channels are the two main causes of habitat destruction. While it is unknown whether habitat change in its wintering grounds of Cuba affected the species, it is believed that a winter hurricane in 1932 could have dealt the species a crippling blow, making them too rare to find each other and mate on their breeding grounds.  The United States Fish and Wildlife Service proposed on Sept. 29, 2021 to declare the species extinct following a lack of evidence of its survival.

In culture
John James Audubon's folio renderings of a male and female Bachman's warbler were painted on top of an illustration of the Franklinia tree first painted by Maria Martin, John Bachman's sister-in-law and one of the country's first female natural history illustrators.

In the comic strip Doonesbury, Dick Davenport, a bird watcher, died in 1986 of a massive coronary while observing and photographing this species, therefore proving its continued existence. This death scene has been noted as a particularly memorable one in the history of comics.

References

Further reading
Bachman's Warbler: A Species in Peril, second edition, by Paul B. Hamel. Full text online.

External links

BirdLife Species Factsheet
Recording of a singing Bachman's warbler, from Cornell's Macaulay Library

Bachman's warbler
New World warblers
Native birds of the Southeastern United States
Birds of Cuba
Bachman's warbler
ESA endangered species
Bachman's warbler